Nymphaea capensis  (Cape blue waterlily) is an aquatic flowering plant of the water lily family Nymphaeaceae.

Native to Africa, the plant is found growing abundantly in freshwater habitats in tropical regions of Africa, and as an introduced species in Australia, the state of Florida, and other tropical areas.  This plant's bulb can survive relatively long periods of time without rainfall in a dry river bed. During the rain season, as the riverbed or bog fills up, the bulb will sprout leaves and flowers.

The Cape blue waterlily grows best in full sun to semi-sun and in relatively shallow water.

Gallery

References

capensis